Kingsley Rock (19 December 1937 – 23 October 2019) was a Montserratian cricketer. He played in two first-class matches for the Leeward Islands in the late 1950s.

See also
 List of Leeward Islands first-class cricketers

References

External links
 

1937 births
2019 deaths
Montserratian cricketers
Leeward Islands cricketers
Place of birth missing